João Gervásio Bragança Moutinho (born 12 January 1998) is a Portuguese footballer who plays for Spezia. Moutinho usually is employed as a left back, although he has also been used as a centre-back.

Moutinho played one season of college soccer for the Akron Zips men's soccer program during the 2017 NCAA Division I men's soccer season. He appeared in all 24 matches for the Zips, and was named a first-team All-American by United Soccer Coaches.

He was the first-overall selection of the 2018 MLS SuperDraft, going to expansion club Los Angeles FC. After one season, he was traded to Orlando, where he won the U.S. Open Cup in 2022.

Career

Youth and college 

Moutinho joined the Sporting CP's Youth Academy in 2008, when he joined the U-10 squad. Moutinho remained with the squad through the U-19's. In 2017, Moutinho signed a National Letter of Intent to play for the Akron Zips men's soccer program for the 2017 season.

While at Akron, Moutinho started in all 24 matches, scoring three and dishing out five assists. The season saw the Zips win the 2017 MAC Men's Soccer Tournament, and reach the College Cup (semi-finals) of the 2017 NCAA Division I Men's Soccer Tournament. At the end of the season, he earned two national distinctions, being named a first-team All-American by United Soccer Coaches, and earned the National Freshman of the Year Award by TopDrawer Soccer. Conference-wise, Moutinho earned the MAC Freshman of the Year Award, and was named to the All-MAC first team.

At the end of his freshman season, Moutinho signed a Generation Adidas contract with Major League Soccer, making him eligible for the 2018 MLS SuperDraft. There, Moutinho was the first overall selection of the draft, signed by expansion franchise, Los Angeles FC.

Professional career

Los Angeles FC 
On 8 January 2018, Moutinho was one of six recipients of a Generation Adidas contract with Major League Soccer. Eleven days later at the 2018 MLS SuperDraft in Philadelphia, he was the first-overall selection, joining expansion team Los Angeles FC.

He made his professional debut on 5 March in LAFC's first MLS game, playing the full 90 minutes in a 1–0 win at the Seattle Sounders FC. On 7 April in a 5–0 loss at Atlanta United FC, he was sent off in added time for handling the ball in the penalty area. He scored his first professional goal on 9 June, the winner in a 4–3 victory at fellow Californians the San Jose Earthquakes, in the seventh minute of added time. The new club came third in the Western Conference and were eliminated in the first round of the 2018 MLS Cup Playoffs 3–2 at home to Real Salt Lake.

Orlando City 
On 11 December 2018 he was traded to Orlando City in exchange for Mohamed El-Monir. He made his debut for the team on 23 March, starting in a 1–0 away win at New York Red Bulls and assisting the only goal by Sacha Kljestan. On 31 July 2020, Moutinho scored his first goal for the club, a 90th-minute equaliser against his former club Los Angeles FC to force a penalty shootout in the MLS is Back Tournament quarter-finals. Orlando won the ensuing shootout.

Moutinho scored his first regular-season goal for Orlando on 2 April 2022 in a 4–2 home loss to Los Angeles. On 7 September, he played in the 2022 U.S. Open Cup Final, a 3–0 win over Sacramento Republic FC.

Spezia 
On 2 December 2022, Moutinho signed a 3-and-a-half year deal with Serie A side Spezia.

Career statistics

College 

 Source

Club

Honors

Individual 
 MAC Men's Soccer Freshman of the Year: 2017
 United Soccer Coaches First-Team All-America: 2017
 TopDrawer Soccer National Freshman of the Year Award: 2017

College 
Akron Zips
 2017 MAC Men's Soccer Tournament champions

Club 
Orlando City
U.S. Open Cup: 2022

References

External links 
 Akron Profile
 
 

1998 births
Living people
Footballers from Lisbon
Akron Zips men's soccer players
Association football defenders
All-American men's college soccer players
Los Angeles FC draft picks
Los Angeles FC players
Orlando City SC players
Spezia Calcio players
Major League Soccer first-overall draft picks
Major League Soccer players
Portuguese footballers
Portuguese expatriate footballers
Expatriate soccer players in the United States
Expatriate footballers in Italy
Portuguese expatriate sportspeople in the United States
Portuguese expatriate sportspeople in Italy